This is a list of defunct airlines of Sudan.

See also
 List of airlines of Sudan
 List of airports in Sudan

References

Sudan
Airlines
Airlines, defunct